Niyazi Manyera (1911–1999) was the first minister of health of the 1960 Republic of Cyprus. Manyera was born 1911 in Famagusta and died on 24 October 1999 in London. After completing his high school studies, he studied medicine in Turkey at the University of Istanbul which he finished in 1939.

Manyera was elected  as the Mayor of Famagusta in 1948. Apart from the activity in the City Council, he also worked in the executive committee of the education commission of the Turkish-Cypriot schools and in the executive committee of the Cyprus-Turkish Dock Workers' Union. With his many roles in the service of his community, Manyera engaged himself in the social development of the Turkish-Cypriot community.

After the declaration of independent Republic of Cyprus, he held the position of the Minister of Health from 1963 till 1974 in the administered zones of the Cyprus Turks. After the establishment of the Turkish Republic of Northern Cyprus in 1975, Manyera withdrew from politics.

External links
 Life and works of Dr Niyazi Manyera
 Biography of Dr Niyazi Manyera
 1960 - Settlement and Independence

Turkish Cypriot politicians
1911 births
1999 deaths
20th-century Cypriot politicians
Health ministers of Cyprus
Mayors of places in Cyprus
Cypriot physicians
20th-century physicians
People from Famagusta
Cypriot expatriates in Turkey
Turkish Cypriot expatriates in the United Kingdom